Panjgirain is a town of Darya Khan Tehsil, Bhakkar District, Punjab, Pakistan. It is also the headquarters of union council Punjgirain. It is located on Darya Khan Kalur Kot Road. There is a basic health unit (BHU) and Govt. High School for boys and girls here. A Panj Girain railway station is also on Multan Kundian railway track section.

Jamia Masjid Sadiqia (Ahale Sunnat) is the largest mosque of the town Jamia Naqvia Arabia is a Shia Islamic School in Panjgirain.
A police patrol check post is also there. Pir Haji Ahmed Sultan, Haji Shah and Imam's are main graveyards.
Wheat, sugarcane, chickpea, Mung bean, and cotton are corps produced there. 

On the east of town the area is desert called Thal and west area is well cultivated near by Indus River called Nashaib.
Main villages in the union council are Jhok Mehar Shah, Jhok Qalander Bakhsh, Jhok Laal Shah, Basti Ahmad Shah wali Dager, Dirkhani Khuh and Nashaib.

References

https://www.google.com/maps/place/Panj+Girain/data=!4m2!3m1!1s0x392661814ed24c4b:0x22818d28e8e47592?sa=X&ved=0ahUKEwiD4JS6kcrLAhXJbRQKHQTxD2YQ8gEIGTAA
http://dsal.uchicago.edu/reference/gazetteer/pager.html?objectid=DS405.1.I34_V11_272.gif
http://en.climate-data.org/location/959163/ 
https://web.archive.org/web/20120209041150/http://www.nrb.gov.pk/lg_election/union.asp?district=4&dn=Bhakkar

Populated places in Bhakkar District
Union councils of Bhakkar District